Francisco Sánchez-Bayo is an environmental scientist and ecologist at the University of Sydney. The author or co-author of over 80 articles and book chapters, Sánchez-Bayo's research interests have focused on the ecological effects of pesticides. In 2019 he was the lead author of a study that predicted the large-scale extinction of insect species. He serves on the board of associate editors of the journal Entomologia Generalis.

Early life and education
Born in Candelario, Spain, Sánchez-Bayo got his master's degree in environmental sciences at the Autonomous University of Madrid (UAM) in 1980, and his doctorate in ecology in 1985, also at UAM, for a thesis entitled "Analysis of the spatial and temporal organisation of a bird community in riverine forests of the Duero basin". In 1990 he received a diploma in applied science, specializing in arid lands management, from the University of New South Wales.

Career
Sánchez-Bayo worked as an assistant professor at Chiba University in Japan for five years from 2001, before taking up a position at the Centre for Ecotoxicology in the Office of the Environment & Heritage of New South Wales, Australia. As of February 2019 he is an honorary associate at the Sydney Institute of Agriculture at the University of Sydney. Sánchez-Bayo was the lead author of a study published in the journal Biological Conservation in 2019 that indicated there has been a dramatic decline in insect populations and predicting the large-scale extinction of insect species, as a result of "the loss of habitat, due to agricultural practices, urbanisation and deforestation".

References

External links

Living people
Spanish emigrants to Australia
Spanish ecologists
Spanish scientists
Academic staff of the University of Sydney
Year of birth missing (living people)